Harry Morton (April 7, 1981 – November 23, 2019) was an American restaurateur and founder of the restaurant chain Pink Taco. Morton was a former owner of the nightclub The Viper Room.

Morton was the son of Peter Morton, co-founder of the restaurant chain Hard Rock Cafe, and the grandson of Arnie Morton, founder of the restaurant chain Morton's The Steakhouse. His mother was fashion model Paulene Stone and his maternal half-sister was bounty hunter Domino Harvey.

On November 23, 2019, Morton was found dead at his home in Beverly Hills, California. The cause of death was sudden cardiac arrest due to undiagnosed coronary artery disease. He also had a mildly enlarged heart.

Following his death, the company released a statement calling Morton "a visionary and restaurateur ahead of his time," and adding that "his contributions, both professionally to our brand and personally to those he worked with, were numerous."

In the post-credit scene of The King's Man film, he is called "a true gentleman who led by example, helped others and knew his duty."

References

External links
 A day in the life of Pink Taco CEO and Viper Room owner Harry Morton
 Pink Taco Founder Harry Morton Dead at 38
 Harry Morton shells out $25.5 million for the Elvis Presley estate in Beverly Hills
 Infamously Named Pink Taco Restaurant Opens in Boston in October
 One on One : A Chip Off The Hard Rock: Harry Morton 
 Harry Morton Kingsman Tribute Explained

 
1981 births
2019 deaths
American people of Jewish descent
American restaurateurs
Morton family (restaurants)
Place of birth missing